The 1996 Nebraska Cornhuskers football team represented the University of Nebraska–Lincoln in the 1996 NCAA Division I-A football season. The team was coached by Tom Osborne and played their home games in Memorial Stadium in Lincoln, Nebraska.

This was the first season for Nebraska in the Big 12 Conference, which took on that name after adding four schools from the disbanded Southwest Conference; the conference had been known as the Big Eight Conference since 1964, and was the Missouri Valley Intercollegiate Athletic Association before that. Nebraska was placed in the North Division with the four other Midwest schools in the conference, plus Colorado, all of which were in the conference prior to 1996; the Oklahoma schools joined with the former SWC members (all of which were in Texas) to form the South Division.

Nebraska participated in the very first Big 12 Championship Game by winning the North Division. They were upset by the unranked winners of the South Division, Texas. They still played in an Alliance bowl, the Orange Bowl, where they beat Virginia Tech.

Schedule

Roster and coaching staff

Depth chart

Game summaries

Michigan State

Arizona State

Colorado State

Kansas State

Baylor

Texas Tech

Kansas

Oklahoma

Missouri

Iowa State

Colorado

Texas

Virginia Tech

Rankings

Awards

NFL and pro players
The following Nebraska players who participated in the 1996 season later moved on to the next level and joined a professional or semi-pro team as draftees or free agents.

References

Nebraska
Nebraska Cornhuskers football seasons
Orange Bowl champion seasons
Nebraska Cornhuskers football